The 1996–97 Wake Forest Demon Deacons men's basketball team represented Wake Forest University in the 1996–97 NCAA Division I men's basketball season.

Roster

Schedule and results

|-
!colspan=9 style=| Regular Season

|-
!colspan=9 style=| ACC Tournament

|-
!colspan=9 style=| NCAA Tournament

Rankings

Awards and honors
Tim Duncan, ACC Player of the Year
 Tim Duncan, Naismith College Player of the Year
 Tim Duncan, USBWA College Player of the Year
 Tim Duncan, John R. Wooden Award

Team players drafted into the NBA

References

Wake Forest Demon Deacons men's basketball seasons
Wake Forest
Wake Forest